Clara Weekes  (30 September 1852 – 12 April 1937) was an Australian schoolteacher, suffragist, labour leader, pacifist, and civil and women's rights activist.

Biography 
Born on 30 September 1852 in Bristol, England, Weekes immigrated to Australia with her parents when she was a child. She taught in Victoria's state-run public schools for over four decades, retiring in 1913. In 1910, she was profiled in The Weekly Times while teaching at Rathdowne Street State School, where she held the highest staff position a woman was allowed to occupy at the time. Weekes served on several Victoria Department of Education committees, including being one of only six women to help organize the 1906 State Schools Exhibition.

For many years, Weekes represented women teachers in the Teacher's Union, and as the head of the Victorian Lady Teacher's Association. She was a strong advocate for equal pay for women, working on behalf not only of teachers but also for women working in other fields. She was also a suffragist, and served on the executive committee for the Victorian Women's Suffrage Society. Weekes worked with Vida Goldstein in both the equal pay and suffrage campaigns.

Weekes was an active leader in other civic organizations as well. A temperance advocate, she was a long-time member of the Women's Christian Temperance Union.  A pacifist, she was a member of the Sisterhood of International Peace, which was formed in 1915. She publicly opposed the White Australia policy. 

Weekes died in Melbourne on 12 April 1937. The Victorian Trades Hall Council runs a Clara Weekes Education Project, named in her honour.

External links 

 Botanical Album owned by Clara Weekes, held in the Walhalla Museum
 Miss Clara Weekes – "A Born Teacher" – How She Works, 1910 interview in The Weekly Times

See also 

 Suffrage in Australia
 Gender pay gap in Australia
 Australian labour movement

References 

1852 births
1937 deaths
Australian schoolteachers
Australian suffragists
Australian pacifists